The 1933 Railway Cup Hurling Championship was the seventh series of the inter-provincial hurling Railway Cup. Two matches were played between 19 February and 17 March 1933. It was contested by Connacht, Leinster and Munster.

Leinster entered the championship as the defending champions.

On 17 March 1933, Leinster won the Railway Cup after a 4-06 to 3-06 defeat of Munster in the final at Croke Park, Dublin. This was their second title in succession and their third title over all.

Munster's Martin Kennedy was the Railway Cup top scorer with 5-01.

Results

Semi-final

Final

Top scorers

Top scorers overall

Sources
 Donegan, Des, The Complete Handbook of Gaelic Games (DBA Publications Limited, 2005).

External links
 Munster Railway Cup-winning teams

Railway Cup Hurling Championship
Railway Cup Hurling Championship